Jiří Měchura is a former Czechoslovak slalom canoeist who competed from the mid-1970s to the mid-1980s. He won a bronze medal in the K-1 team event at the 1983 ICF Canoe Slalom World Championships in Meran.

References

External links 
 Jiri MECHURA at CanoeSlalom.net

Czechoslovak male canoeists
Living people
Year of birth missing (living people)
Medalists at the ICF Canoe Slalom World Championships